The Sony α6400 (model ILCE-6400) is a digital camera announced January 15, 2019. It is an APS-C mirrorless interchangeable lens camera (MILC) designed to be a mid-range mirrorless camera and act as an update of the α6300. Sony is targeting the vlogging community with the α6400's flip-up screen and aggressive pricing. It features the same 24 megapixel sensor seen in the α6500. At the time of release, the two most capable cameras in the α6000 series of cameras were the α6400 and the α6500. The α6500 featured in-body image stabilization, and a larger image buffer, but in most other respects the α6400 is a more advanced camera. This is largely due to its processing power, enabling features like animal eye AF, and autofocus tracking. These features, for example, can not be added to the α6300 via a firmware update, as it is too demanding a feature.

At its announcement, the Sony α6400 is advertised as featuring the "world's fastest autofocus" with lag of 0.02 second and 11 fps continuous shooting with continuous AF and 8 fps with the silent shutter. Its MSRP is $889 for the body and $998 with a 16–50 mm power-zoom kit lens f/3.5-5.6.

Sony's α6400 also saw a much-needed upgrade to the photo sharing apps and the reintroduction of time-lapse videos via the menu system.

For video shooters, a welcome change for the α6400 was the removal of the 30-minute record limit. This limit is an artificial one placed on many cameras to avoid being taxed differently. The α6400 is also a vast improvement for Sony with regards to overheating (most likely to occur whilst recording 4K due to the processing demands). Online tests showed that in modest ambient temperatures, you will flatten the battery or fill the memory card before you overheat the camera.

Firmware 2.0 was released for the α6400 on 13 June 2019, introducing animal eye AF, the ability to use the wireless remote commander RMT-P1BT, as well as claimed stability improvements.

Features 

 24.2-megapixel Exmor CMOS sensor
 425-point phase detection AF
 Real-time Eye AF; Real-time Tracking
 Super 35 mm format, 4K movie recording with full pixel readout and no pixel binning
 LCD touchscreen (2.95 inch) with 180-degree tilt up functionality
 1.0 cm (0.39-inch) electronic viewfinder
 1200-zone evaluative light metering
 Built-in Wi-Fi, NFC and Bluetooth
 LED-auto focus illuminator
 Continuous shooting: Hi+: 11 fps, Hi: 8 fps, Mid: 6 fps, Lo: 3 fps
 My Menu system
 Single memory card slot (UHS-1 compatible)
 Electronic shutter for silent shooting 
 Interval Shooting (time-lapse) 
 Animal Eye AF  (With firmware v2.00)
 Allows the operation with the wireless remote commander RMT-P1BT (Firmware v2.0)

Reception 
After its announcement, numerous first impressions released from popular YouTube vloggers and camera-focused channels. Full reviews are not out yet but the general consensus is Sony priced it correctly, but for some the lack of the new Zbattery and the fact the flip-up screen blocks the hot shoe mount are odd choices.

See also 

 List of Sony E-mount cameras
 Sony α6300
 Sony α6500
 Sony α7 III
 Sony α7r III
 Sony α9

References

External links

Meet the new Sony Alpha A6400 Mirrorless Camera
Sony A6400 Sample Images

α6000
Live-preview digital cameras
Cameras introduced in 2019